Bermuda competed at the 2022 Commonwealth Games in Birmingham, England between 28 July and 8 August 2022. Bermuda was present at the inaugural Games in 1930 and made its nineteenth appearance.

Bermuda's team of 17 athletes (eight men and nine women), competing in five sports was named on June 18, 2022.

Dage Minors and Emma Keane served as the delegation's flagbearers during the 2022 Commonwealth Games opening ceremony.

Medalists

Competitors
Bermuda received a quota of 17 open allocation slots from Commonwealth Sport. This quota is used to determine the overall team in sports lacking a qualifying system.

The following is the list of number of competitors participating at the Games per sport/discipline.

Athletics

Three athletes were officially selected on 26 April 2022, with two more added on 13 June 2022.

Men
Track and road events

Field events

Women
Track and road events

Field events

Cycling

One cyclist was officially selected on 26 April 2022; three more were added on 13 June 2022.

Road
Men

Women

Squash

One player was officially selected on 13 June 2022.

Swimming

Two swimmers were officially selected on 26 April 2022, with another swimmer added on 13 June 2022.

Men

Women

Triathlon

On 26 April 2022, Bermuda announced a squad of four triathletes, including Tokyo 2020 champion Flora Duffy.

Individual

Mixed relay

References

External links
Bermuda Olympic Association Official site

Nations at the 2022 Commonwealth Games
Bermuda at the Commonwealth Games
2022 in Bermudian sport